The Lincoln School in Erie, Colorado, at 645 Holbrook St., was built in 1906.  It was listed on the National Register of Historic Places in 1981. It was expanded in 1920 by addition of four more classrooms.  It served as a school until 1966. It operated as a school until 1966. In 1981 it was serving as the Erie Town Hall.

In 2021 it is still the town hall. It was renovated and turned into a town hall in 1998. In 2015 it was designated Erie's third local landmark.

References

City and town halls in Colorado
Schools in Colorado
National Register of Historic Places in Weld County, Colorado
School buildings completed in 1906
School buildings on the National Register of Historic Places in Colorado